{{nihongo|Hatakeyama Shigetada|畠山 重忠||1164– 20 July 1205}} was a samurai warlord of the late Heian and early Kamakura period Japan. He fought in the Genpei War, though originally for the Taira clan, he switched sides to the Minamoto clan for the Battle of Dan-no-ura, and ended the war on the winning side.

His Dharma name was Jissan Shūshin Daikoji (實山宗眞大居士).

Biography
Following the war, when his son Shigeyasu was killed by Hōjō Tokimasa, Shigetada spoke up. The reward for this temerity was death, along with the rest of his family. His brave attempt to defend his honor, along with various other acts of strength and skill are recorded  in the Heike Monogatari and other chronicles of the period.

In an anecdote from the Heike monogatari, he is described as competing, along with a number of other warriors, to be the first across the Uji River. When his horse is shot in the head with an arrow, he abandons the creature and uses his bow as a staff to help himself across. Just as he is about to climb the bank, however, his godson Okushi no Shigechika asks for help, and is grabbed and thrown ashore by Shigetada; Shigechika then stands tall and proclaims himself the winner, the first across the river.

After the Battle of Awazu in 1184, Shigetada was known for failing to capture Tomoe Gozen.

Gallery

Notes

References
 Joly, Henri L. (1967).  Legend in Japanese Art: a Description of Historical Episodes, Legendary Characters, Folk-lore Myths, Religious Symbolism, Illustrated in the Arts of Old Japan. Rutland, Vermont: Tuttle. ;  OCLC 219871829
 Kitagawa, Hiroshi and Burce T. Tsuchida, ed. (1975). The Tale of the Heike. Tokyo: University of Tokyo Press.  OCLC 164803926
 Nussbaum, Louis Frédéric and Käthe Roth. (2005). Japan Encyclopedia. Cambridge: Harvard University Press. ; OCLC 48943301
 Varley, Paul. (1994). Warriors of Japan as Portrayed in the War Tales. Honolulu: University of Hawaii Press. ; ;  OCLC 246555065

External links
 Grunwald Center for the Graphic Arts, UCLA Hammer Museum:  woodcut print -- "Battle of Uji River" or "Hatekeyama Shigetada fording the Uji River,"  Utagawa Kuniyoshi (1797-1861)

1164 births
1205 deaths
Taira clan
Hatakeyama clan
People of Heian-period Japan
People of Kamakura-period Japan
Heian period Buddhists
Kamakura period Buddhists